Orhan Delibaş (born January 28, 1971) is a retired Turkish-born Dutch boxer. He won the Light Middleweight Silver medal at the 1992 Summer Olympics. A year later, he captured the silver medal once again at the 1993 European Amateur Boxing Championships in Bursa, Turkey. He has a professional record of 25-2

Amateur Highlights
1991 competed as a Light-Middleweight at World Championships in Sydney, Australia
Lost to Torsten Schmitz (Germany) 14-18
1992 captured the silver medal, representing the Netherlands as a Light-Middleweight at the Olympic Games in Barcelona
Defeated Ki-Soo Choi (South Korea) 3-0
Defeated Chalit Boonsingkarn (Thailand) TKO 2
Defeated Raúl Márquez (United States) 16-12
Defeated Robin Reid (Great Britain) 8-3
Lost to Juan Carlos Lemus (Cuba) 1-6
1993 competed as a Light-Middleweight at World Championships in Tampere, Finland
Defeated Hee-Joon Kim (South Korea) points
Defeated Vahe Kocharian (Armenia) points
Lost to Francisc Vastag (Romania) points
1993 2nd place as a Light-Middleweight at European Championships in Bursa, Turkey
Defeated Mamouka Khoutouashvili (Georgia) DQ 3
Defeated R. Sarganessian (Armenia) points
Defeated Bert Schenk (Germany) points
Lost to Francisc Vastag (Romania) points
1994 Light-Middleweight Bronze Medalist at Goodwill Games in St. Petersburg, Russia
Defeated Malik Beyleroğlu (Turkey) points
Lost to Sergey Karavayev (Russia) points
1995 Light-Middleweight Champion at World Military Championships

Pro career
Delibaş began his professional career in 1995, under his nickname The Turkish Delight, and won his first 22 bouts in the middleweight division. His first loss was to contender Mamadou Thiam in a TKO in the 8th round. In 2000, he took on future titlist Roman Karmazin and lost in a TKO 3 after he failed to come out of his corner.

External links
 

1971 births
Dutch male boxers
Turkish male boxers
Boxers at the 1992 Summer Olympics
Olympic boxers of the Netherlands
Olympic silver medalists for the Netherlands
Living people
Dutch people of Turkish descent
Olympic medalists in boxing
People from Kayseri
Medalists at the 1992 Summer Olympics
Light-middleweight boxers
Competitors at the 1994 Goodwill Games